Public holidays in Italy are established by the Italian parliament and, with the exception of city or community patronal days, apply nationwide. These include a mix of national, religious and local observances. As for Whit Monday, there is an exception for South Tyrol. In Italy there are also State commemoration days, which are not public holidays.

Overview

Italy's National Day, the Festa della Repubblica (Republic Day), is celebrated on 2 June each year, with the main celebration taking place in Rome, and commemorates the birth of the Italian Republic in 1946. The ceremony of the event organized in Rome includes the deposition of a laurel wreath as a tribute to the Italian Unknown Soldier at the Altare della Patria by the President of the Italian Republic and a military parade along Via dei Fori Imperiali in Rome.

Liberation Day is a national holiday in Italy that takes place on 25 April commemorating the victory of the Italian resistance movement against Nazi Germany and the Italian Social Republic, puppet state of the Nazis and rump state of the fascists, in the Italian Civil War, a civil war in Italy fought during World War II. The date was chosen by convention, as it was the day of the year in 1945 when the National Liberation Committee of Upper Italy (CLNAI) officially proclaimed the insurgency in a radio announcement, propounding the seizure of power by the CLNAI and proclaiming the death sentence for all fascist leaders (including Benito Mussolini, who was shot three days later).

17 March was proclaimed a national holiday in 1911, the 50th Anniversary of the Unification of Italy, in 1961, the 100th anniversary of the Unification of Italy, and in 2011, the 150th anniversary of the Unification of Italy. The law no. 222 of 23 November 2012 the Giornata dell'Unità nazionale, della Costituzione, dell'inno e della bandiera ("Day of National Unity, the Constitution, the anthem and the flag") was established to be celebrated on 17 March of each year, on the day of the proclamation of the Unification of Italy in 1861, however it is not to be considered a festive day.

Until 1977 the following were also considered public holidays in Italy for civil purposes:

 19 March, Saint Joseph Day;
 40 days after Easter, Ascension of Jesus;
 60 days after Easter, Corpus Christi;
 29 June, Saints Peter and Paul, patron saints of Rome (it remained a public holiday only in the municipality of Rome);
 4 November, National Unity and Armed Forces Day.

These public holidays were suppressed, during the austerity caused by the 1973 oil crisis, on the basis of the law n. 54 of 5 March 1977. In particular, in 1977 National Unity and Armed Forces Day became a moveable feast, and celebrations occurred every first Sunday of November. National Unity and Armed Forces Day is an Italian national day since 1919 which commemorates the victory in World War I, a war event considered the completion of the process of unification of Italy. It is celebrated every 4 November, which is the anniversary of the armistice of Villa Giusti becoming effective in 1918 declaring Austria-Hungary's surrender. Italy entered World War I in 1915 with the aim of completing national unity and for this reason, the Italian intervention in World War I is also considered the Fourth Italian War of Independence, in a historiographical perspective that identifies in the latter the conclusion of the unification of Italy, whose military actions began during the revolutions of 1848 with the First Italian War of Independence.

In addition to the 12 national holidays, each city or town celebrates a public holiday on the occasion of the festival of the local patron saint. For example, Rome on 29 June (Saints Peter and Paul), Milan on 7 December (Saint Ambrose), Naples on 19 September (Saint Januarius), Venice on 25 April (Saint Mark the Evangelist) and Florence on 24 June (Saint John the Baptist). In South Tyrol, the holiday is instead on Whit Monday. This makes the total public holidays in Italy 13. 

The Italian national patronal day, on 4 October, celebrates Saints Francis and Catherine. Notable patronal festivals in Italy are the Festival of Saint Agatha in Catania, the Feast of Saints Peter and Paul in Rome, the Feast of San Gennaro in Naples and Little Italy, New York and the Feast of Our Lady of the Hens in Pagani.

This number does not correspond to the number of days off work as public holidays falling on weekends are not transferred. When a holiday falls on a Tuesday or a Thursday it is common practice to make a ponte (pl. ponti. English: "bridge") in order to have a long weekend. Schools are usually closed.

Christmas in Italy (in Italian: Natale) begins on 8 December, with the feast of the Immaculate Conception, the day on which traditionally the Christmas tree is mounted and ends on 6 January, of the following year with the Epiphany (in Italian: Epifania). The term "Natale" derives from the Latin natalis, which literally means "birth".

During the Italian public holidays, peaks of tourist flows in Italy are recorded, particularly in winter due to the Christmas and New Year's Day holidays, in spring, due to the Easter holidays, and in summer, due to the favourable climate. For internal tourism, peaks of tourist flows are also recorded on the occasion of the three national civil holidays, Liberation Day (25 April), International Workers' Day (1 May) and the Festa della Repubblica (2 June), as well as for three religious holidays, the Ferragosto (15 August), All Saints' Day (1 November) and the Feast of the Immaculate Conception (8 December), especially in the presence of ponti.

Current holidays

Current holidays in Italy are:

State commemorations 
The following days are not public holidays, but are nevertheless official State commemorations.

Civil solemnities

Celebratory days

See also

 Culture of Italy
 Christmas in Italy
 Ferragosto
 Traditions of Italy

Notes

References

 
Italy
Holidays